Mohammad Qasim Sheikh (born 30 October 1984 in Glasgow) is a cricketer, who has played for Scotland and Pakistan Customs.

A left-handed batsman, he made his debut for Scotland in a game against the Netherlands in the 2005 ICC Intercontinental Cup. He had previously represented his country in the 2002 Under-19 World Cup in New Zealand.

In Scottish domestic cricket he has played for Clydesdale the same club he joined when he was only seven years old. Sheikh has played for Clydesdale at every level from under-12s all the way through the ranks until he was selected for the 1st eleven, and in 2007 he went on to become the first Asian captain at the age of 22.

In 2009, Glasgow-born Sheikh became the first Scottish-born cricketer to score a first-class century in Pakistan, when he played for the Customs team through the winter. He has represented his country on more than 20 occasions, including the ICC World Twenty20 Championships in South Africa (2007) and England (2009).
The 2011 season sees Sheikh attempting to reach double figures in the Central Yorkshire Cricket League for Wakefield Thornes CC.

References

External links
Cricinfo

1984 births
Living people
Scottish cricketers
Scotland One Day International cricketers
Scottish people of Pakistani descent
Pakistan Customs cricketers
Cricketers from Glasgow
British Asian cricketers
British sportspeople of Pakistani descent
Pakistani cricketers
Pakistani emigrants to Scotland